Wasp was a ship built in 1776. It was used as a slave ship and completed 11 slave voyages.

References

Slave ships